Macrocoma fuscoaenea is a species of leaf beetle found in Ethiopia, Tanzania and the Democratic Republic of the Congo. It was first described by Félicien Chapuis in 1879.

References 

fuscoaenea
Beetles of Africa
Beetles of the Democratic Republic of the Congo
Insects of Ethiopia
Insects of Tanzania
Beetles described in 1879
Taxa named by Félicien Chapuis